The Carl Philipp Emanuel Bach Museum, also called the CPE Bach-Museum, is a museum in the Composers Quarter in Hamburg-Neustadt, Germany. It gives an impression of the work and life of the classical composer Carl Philipp Emanuel Bach. The museum was inaugurated on 18 March 2015 and is accessible for wheelchair users. 	

The museum gives insight in the environment Bach grew up. Musically he was the most gifted and known child of the five children of Johann Sebastian Bach. In Hamburg he succeeded Georg Philipp Telemann as the curator and music director of the five main churches of the city. During two decades he sojourned in the musical life here, from 1768 to 1788.

He left behind a great number of compositions, and held around 200 performances a year. At audio stations in the museum his music can be listened to. Information is given on the particularities of his music and the influence it had on the society in his time. Visitors can have a virtual tour through Hamburg in which they are confided a conversation between Bach and the contemporary music historian Charles Burney.

For an authentic appearance, some furniture was rebuilt with the characteristics from Bachs era. At the center of the museum one finds a clavichord, the favorite instrument of Bach. He was admired for his play on this instrument.

Impression

See also 
 List of museums in Germany
 List of music museums

References 

Music museums in Germany
Museums in Hamburg
Museums established in 2015
2015 establishments in Germany
Biographical museums in Germany